Columbus North High School (CNHS) is one of the public high schools located in Columbus, Indiana.  It is part of the Bartholomew Consolidated School Corporation (BCSC).  Columbus North High School was previously known as Columbus High School. It was renamed Columbus North High School in 1973 upon the founding of Columbus East High School.

Demographics
The demographic breakdown of the students enrolled for the 2018-2019 school year is as follows:

Male = 48.8%
Female = 51.2%
White = 70.2%
Hispanic = 17.1%
Asian = 6.4%
Multiracial = 3.4%
Black = 2.6%
Native American / Alaska Native = 0.2%
Native Hawaiian / Pacific Islander = 0.1%

Athletics 

The North Bull Dogs are members of Conference Indiana.  The school colors are royal blue and white.  The following IHSAA sanctioned sports are offered:

 Baseball (boys)
 Basketball (boys & girls)
 Cross Country (boys & girls)
 Football (boys)
 Golf (boys & girls)
 Gymnastics
 Soccer (boys & girls)
 Softball (girls)
 Swimming & Diving (boys & girls)
 Tennis (boys & girls)
 Track and Field (boys & girls)
 Volleyball (girls)
 Wrestling (boys)

Notable alumni
Christy Mack, actress
Michael Evans Behling, actor
Michael Brinegar, American swimmer (attended, did not graduate)
Tyler Duncan, professional golfer
Ray Eddy, former head basketball coach for Purdue
Jamie Hyneman, co-host of the television series MythBusters
Mike Pence, 48th Vice President of the United States
Morgan Proffitt, Professional soccer player for the Washington Spirit of the National Women's Soccer League.
Tony Stewart, NASCAR driver
Chuck Taylor, American basketball player and shoe salesman/evangelist, Chuck Taylor All-Stars

See also
 List of high schools in Indiana
 Conference Indiana
 Columbus, Indiana

References

External links

CNHS Main Page

Public high schools in Indiana
Schools in Bartholomew County, Indiana
Columbus, Indiana
Educational institutions with year of establishment missing